"Haide" is a 2017 song written by Phoebus and recorded by Greek singer Elena Paparizou from her album Ouranio Toxo.

Charts

References

Helena Paparizou songs
Number-one singles in Greece
Greek-language songs
Songs written by Phoebus (songwriter)
2017 songs